Gerry Lowe (16 November 1927 – 2 March 2018) was an English rugby union, and professional rugby league footballer who played in the 1940s and 1950s.

Background
Gerry Lowe was born in Warrington, Lancashire, England, and he died aged 90 in Altrincham, Trafford.

Playing career

Warrington
Lowe joined Warrington in 1950 and was a member of the squad that won the Lancashire League four times in six seasons during the 1950s; 1950–51, 1953–54, 1954–55 and 1955–56.

Gerry Lowe made his début for Warrington on Friday 7 April 1950 at Widnes, and he played his last match for Warrington on Saturday 11 February 1956 in a Challenge Cup game against St. Helens.

In his first season with Warrington Lowe played right-, in Warrington's 19–0 victory over Widnes in the 1949–50 Challenge Cup Final  at Wembley Stadium, London on Saturday 6 May 1950, in front of a crowd of 94,249.

In 1954 he played right- in the 4–4 draw with Halifax in the 1954 Challenge Cup Final during the 1953–54 season at Wembley Stadium on Saturday 24 April 1954, in front of a crowd of 81,841 and played in the same position as Warrington won 8–4 in the replay  at Odsal Stadium, Bradford, on Wednesday 5 May 1954, in front of a record crowd of 102,575 or more.

Keighley
After leaving Warrington, Lowe joined Keighley where he scored 5 tries in 95 appearances between 1956 and 1959.

Representative games
Love appeared for Lancashire on four occasions.

References

External links
Statistics at wolvesplayers.thisiswarrington.co.uk

1927 births
2018 deaths
English rugby league players
English rugby union players
Keighley Cougars players
Lancashire rugby league team players
Rugby league players from Warrington
Rugby league props
Rugby league second-rows
Rugby union players from Warrington
Warrington Wolves players